KAUM (107.1 FM, "Real Country") is a radio station broadcasting a country music format. Licensed to Colorado City, Texas, United States, the station is currently owned by Pete Garcia, Jr., through licensee Extreme Media, LLC, and features programming from ABC Radio.

References

External links

AUM
Country radio stations in the United States
Radio stations established in 1986
1986 establishments in Texas